John Fernside (died 27 October 1957, aged 65) was an Australian actor who worked extensively on stage and screen from the 1910s through to 1950s. He co-starred with Chips Rafferty in two Australian films of the 1940s; The Overlanders (1946) and Bush Christmas (1947).

Fernside was born in Perth, Western Australia and worked his way up through the theatre.

Select film credits
Uncivilized (1936)
Wings of Destiny (1940)
The Power and the Glory (1941)
The Overlanders (1946)
Bush Christmas (1947)
No Strangers Here (1950)
The Glenrowan Affair (1951)

References

External links

John Fernside's Australian theatre credits at AusStage

20th-century Australian male actors
Australian male film actors
Australian male stage actors
Male actors from Perth, Western Australia
Year of birth missing
1957 deaths